The 2020 Philippine Cup, also known as the 2020 Honda PBA Philippine Cup for sponsorship reasons,  is the only conference or tournament of the 2020 PBA season of the Philippine Basketball Association (PBA). The 42nd PBA Philippine Cup started on March 8 and ended on December 9, 2020. The tournament does not allow teams to hire foreign players or imports.

Three days later, the PBA board of governors decided to indefinitely postpone the tournament, together with the PBA D-League Aspirants' Cup, and the launching of the PBA 3x3 league, due to the COVID-19 pandemic in the country and the enforcement of the various quarantine restrictions throughout the country.

During their meeting on September 17, the PBA Board of Governors decided to resume the tournament and create the "PBA bubble" (similar to the successful NBA bubble) within the Clark area in Pampanga. The games were played at the Angeles University Foundation Sports and Cultural Center while the players stayed at the Quest Hotel inside Clark. On September 24, the Inter-Agency Task Force for the Management of Emerging Infectious Diseases (IATF-EID) gave the league a provisional approval to have scrimmages and five-on-five games.  The 12 PBA teams arrived in Clark by batches on September 28 and 29, 2020.

On October 6, the league published its complete eliminations schedule. The elimination round games of the Philippine Cup resumed in the "PBA bubble" on October 11 and played daily with two games scheduled per day.

The tournament was temporarily postponed between October 30 to November 2 after a Blackwater Elite player and one of the league's referees tested positive for COVID-19.

After new protocols have been added, the games resumed starting November 3. In order for the league to finish the elimination round by November 11, two to four games were scheduled per day. This was the first time that the PBA had a quadruple-header game day and an official game scheduled in the morning.

Format
The following format will be observed for the duration of the conference. The two of the quarterfinals match-ups were originally be a best-of-three series, and the semifinals be a best-of-seven series but was revised to all quarterfinal match-ups be in a twice-to-beat format, and the semifinals be in a best-of-five series during the planning for the "PBA bubble":
 Single-round robin eliminations; 11 games per team; Teams are then seeded by basis on win–loss records.
Top eight teams will advance to the quarterfinals. In case of tie, playoff games will be held only for the #8 seed.
Quarterfinals (top 4 seeds twice-to-beat):
QF1: #1 vs #8
QF2: #2 vs #7
QF3: #3 vs #6
QF4: #4 vs #5
Semifinals (best-of-5 series):
SF1: QF1 Winner vs. QF4 Winner
SF2: QF2 Winner vs. QF3 Winner
Finals (best-of-7 series)
F1: SF1 Winner vs SF2 Winner

Elimination round

Team standings

Schedule

Results

Bracket

Quarterfinals

(1) Barangay Ginebra vs. (8) Rain or Shine

(2) Phoenix vs. (7) Magnolia

(3) TNT vs. (6) Alaska

(4) San Miguel vs. (5) Meralco

Semifinals

(1) Barangay Ginebra vs. (5) Meralco

(2) Phoenix vs. (3) TNT

Finals

Awards

Players of the Week

Rookies of the Week

Statistics

Individual statistical leaders

Individual game highs

Team statistical leaders

Final ranking

See also
COVID-19 pandemic in the Philippines
Impact of the COVID-19 pandemic on sports

References

Philippine Cup
PBA Philippine Cup
PBA Philippine Cup